The 2021–22 season is Tranmere Rovers's 138th year in their history and second consecutive season in League Two. Along with the league, the club are also competing in the FA Cup, the EFL Cup and the 2021–22 EFL Trophy. The season covers the period from 1 July 2021 to 30 June 2022.

During pre-season, Micky Mellon returned to the club as he was announced as the new manager.

Pre-season friendlies
Tranmere Rovers announced they would have a friendly against Rangers, Stalybridge Celtic, Warrington Town and Sunderland as part of their pre-season preparations.

Competitions

League Two

League table

Results summary

Results by matchday

Matches
Tranmere Rovers' league fixtures were revealed on 24 June 2021.

FA Cup

Tranmere were drawn away to Crawley Town in the first round and to Leyton Orient in the second round.

EFL Cup

Rovers were drawn away to Oldham Athletic in the first round.

EFL Trophy

Transfers

Transfers in

Loans in

Loans out

Transfers out

References

Tranmere Rovers
Tranmere Rovers F.C. seasons